Boroditsky is a Slavic masculine surname, its feminine counterpart is Boroditskaya. It may refer to:

Lera Boroditsky (born  1976), Belarusian-American cognitive scientist 
Marina Boroditskaya (born 1954), Russian children's poet and translator

Russian-language surnames